Get Out Alive with Bear Grylls is an American reality competition series hosted by adventurer and survivalist Bear Grylls. The eight-episode series premiered on NBC on July 8, 2013.

Format
Ten teams of two compete to survive in the wild of New Zealand with Bear Grylls as their guide. The teams will perform various tasks and missions as they battle unforgiving terrain: high mountains, glaciers, gorges, the rain forest, rivers and rapids. Each week Grylls will eliminate one team, and the last team remaining will win $500,000.

Contestants

Season 1 (2013)

Source:

Summary table

Tasks :
 Fire: make fire for the whole group.
 Food: make sure the whole group gets fed.
 Obstacle: make sure all the teams go through the obstacles safely and efficiently. 
 Shelter: make sure every team has good shelter, and is dry, safe, and warm.

Result:
Safe: Winners of the challenge, safe from elimination for the week, and win a trip to the feast pit.
Low: Team judged to be poor performers.
Out: Team eliminated

Development and production
In October 2012, NBC gave a green-light for the production of eight episodes of the series. Auditions were held in December 2012 and January 2013 in nine cities in the U.S. The series was filmed in the South Island, New Zealand.

International broadcast
Discovery International has purchased the rights to the series, to be aired on Discovery Channel in 218 countries beginning in the third quarter of 2013.

Series overview

Episodes

See also
 Robinsonade
 :Category:Works about survival skills
 Survivor (TV series)

References

External links

Adventure reality television series
2010s American reality television series
2013 American television series debuts
American adventure television series
English-language television shows
NBC original programming
Works about survival skills
Television shows set in New Zealand
2013 American television series endings